Pico do Barbado is the highest mountain in the Brazilian state of Bahia, and the highest in all Northeastern Brazil, reaching  above sea level. It is located within the area of the Chapada Diamantina National Park. From Catolés, it is possible to reach the peak via a trail.

References 

Mountains of Brazil
Landforms of Bahia
Highest points of Brazilian states